Filipp Filippovich Vigel (Филипп Филиппович Вигель, Philip Philipovich Weigel; 1786-1856) was a Russian noble of Swedish extraction who served in the foreign ministry, accompanied Count Golovkin on his 1805 mission to China, presided over the department of foreign religions and governed the town of Kerch.

Vigel witnessed every major event of Alexander I's reign and conversed with other Russian cultural figures. His colleagues at the Arzamas Society included Alexander Pushkin, who gently mocked Vigel's homosexual proclivities in a verse epistle.

Vigel is remembered primarily for his copious memoirs covering the history of Russia from the reign of Emperor Paul to the November Uprising (1831). They were published by Mikhail Katkov in 1864; the expanded edition (1892) appeared in seven books.

Vigel's reminiscences are engaging, pithy and readily quotable. They are considered unreliable in so far as they concern the Western-leaning literati such as Nikolai Gogol and Pyotr Chaadayev. Vigel hated them passionately. It was Vigel who denounced Chaadayev to the authorities.

References

External links 
  The Memoirs of Filipp Vigel

1786 births
1856 deaths
Diplomats of the Russian Empire
Russian memoirists
Mayors of places in the Russian Empire
Russian gay writers
Russian LGBT politicians
Gay memoirists
Gay politicians
Gay diplomats
19th-century memoirists